"Everlasting" is BoA's 18th Japanese single and 4th Korean single. The leading track "Everlasting" is a ballad, and the B-side track, "Soundscape" is a mid-tempo song for Japanese version and "People say..." for the Korean version B-side track. This single also contains the first "classical version" (orchestral composition remake) of any BoA songs thus far, "Everlasting: Classical Ver.".

Commercial endorsements
"Everlasting" was used as the network advertisement for the online Japanese music giant, music.jp; it was also used as the ending theme for the TV Asahi drama "Gate of Miracles". In addition to these two large endorsements, "Everlasting" was also used as the featured track for the Japanese dubbing of the movie Oliver Twist. There were no endorsements using "Soundscape".

Music video
This music video consists of many scenes. The first scene shown is of BoA in a dark room with a flower and many photographs scattered throughout the floor of the room. Also there are three windows to the room. Through each of windows, BoA is there, one with a big black hat with a white dress, another with a flower in her hair and the atmosphere like autumn and the last is BoA sitting upon a bell tower dressed in completely black. The music video takes turns  between all the scenes and BoA is shown singing throughout all of them.

Track listing

Japanese version
 Everlasting
 Soundscape
 Everlasting: Classical ver.
 Everlasting: TV Mix
 Soundscape: TV Mix

Korean version
 Everlasting
 People Say... (슬픔은 넘쳐도)
 Everlasting (Classical ver.)
 Everlasting (Instrumental)
 People Say... (슬픔은 넘쳐도) (Instrumental)

Release history

Charts

2006 singles
BoA songs
Pop ballads
Song articles with missing songwriters
2006 songs